Vernie D. McGaha (born September 13, 1947) is an American politician and former state senator for Kentucky's south central 15th district, which includes the counties of Adair, Casey, Pulaski, and Russell.

Biography

McGaha is the son of Schyler and Barbara McGaha of Columbia in Adair County. He graduated in 1965 from Adair County High School. He studied music and in 1969 received a Bachelor of Science degree from Campbellsville University in Campbellsville in Taylor County in central Kentucky. In 1971, he received a master's degree from Western Kentucky University in Bowling Green. From 1969 to 1986, McGaha was band director at Russell County High School in Russell Springs. He was appointed principal of Union Chapel Elementary School from 1986 to 1987 and Russell County Middle School from 1988 to 1995. After he retired from professional education, McGaha said he felt the call of God that he enter politics, adding that he delights in helping constituents "stuck in the red tape of government."

McGaha is a member of the New Hope Separate Baptist Church in Russell Springs, where he serves as senior deacon, adult Sunday school teacher, and pianist. He is the lead singer and pianist of the Crossroads Quartet, a gospel singing group in Russell Springs, which began in 1960 and performs mostly in Kentucky, Tennessee, and Indiana. McGaha's father, a baritone, has also been a member of the group, which should not be confused with a barbershop quartet also called Crossroads.

In an interview with the alumni magazine, The Campbellsvillian, the Reverend John Chowning, a Campbellsville University administrator who has known McGaha since the late 1960s, describes the senator as committed to "a life of service very much in line with then many Christian servant leaders among the more than 10,000 CU alumni around the world. . . . He has deep roots in the Christian faith and church, community, and family -- those things that are at the foundation of what has made our nation great. . . . He is a person of strong convictions and is known as an elected official who is accessible to the people and who has maintained close ties to his constituents."

McGaha and his wife, the former Connie Sue Smith, are the parents of two children.

Committees 
McGaha served on these committees: (1) Agriculture and Natural Resources [Vice Chair], (2) Veterans, Military Affairs, and Public Protection, (3) Appropriations and Revenue, and (4) Education [Vice Chair]. The chairman of the Education Committee is Kenneth W. Winters, a Republican from Murray, who is also a former president of McGaha's alma mater, Campbellsville University.

On February 22, 2012, McGaha received the "Kids First Advocacy Award" from the Kentucky School Boards Association. The award is presented annually to a lawmaker from each of the two houses of the Kentucky Legislature.

Senate departure

McGaha did not seek reelection to the Senate in 2012 and endorsed Mark Polston as his successor. However, Republican primary voters nominated Chris Girdler, who then won the seat in the November general election.

References 

1947 births
Living people
People from Russell County, Kentucky
Western Kentucky University alumni
Campbellsville University alumni
Republican Party Kentucky state senators
American school principals
Baptists from Kentucky